The 101st Pennsylvania House of Representatives District is located in Southeastern Pennsylvania and has been represented since 2023 by John A. Schlegel.

District profile
The 101st Pennsylvania House of Representatives District is located in Lebanon County. It includes the Josiah Funck Mansion. It is made up of the following areas:

 Cornwall
 Lebanon
 North Cornwall Township
 North Lebanon Township
 South Lebanon Township
 West Cornwall Township
 West Lebanon Township

Representatives

Recent election results

References

External links
District map from the United States Census Bureau
Pennsylvania House Legislative District Maps from the Pennsylvania Redistricting Commission.  
Population Data for District 101 from the Pennsylvania Redistricting Commission.

Government of Lebanon County, Pennsylvania
101